Berkshire Mall was a shopping mall located in Lanesborough, Massachusetts outside Pittsfield. The mall was built in 1988 and closed in 2019. It could be reached from both Route 8 and U.S. Route 7. Currently the mall's one tenant is Target.

History
The mall opened in September 1988. The original anchor stores at the mall were Hills (later Ames), JCPenney, Sears, Service Merchandise, and local chain Steiger's. Steiger's sold its locations to Filene's (later Macy's) in 1994. Service Merchandise closed in 1999. The building was razed and replaced with Best Buy and Linens 'n Things in 2002. Ames, which closed in 2001, was replaced with a Target in 2002. (That Target, however, wouldn't open until January 2006.) An Old Navy store was added to the mall in 2000.

The late 2010's saw multiple classic chain anchors retreat from brick and morter after being challenged by digital retailers in recent years.

On January 6, 2016, Macy's announced that it would be closing during a series of closures.

In 2016, the owner of the mall became Kohan Retail Property Group after the previous owner, Strategic Mall Services (operating as Berkshire Mall LLC), sold it to them.

On March 17, 2017, JCPenney also announced that it was closing during a series of closures.

On November 2, 2017, Sears announced that they would be closing during a series of closures.

On May 28, 2019, under new ownership, the mall closed permanently except for Target and Regal Cinemas.

On February 1, 2022, Regal Cinemas closed forever, leaving Target as its last remaining tenant.

References

Shopping malls in Massachusetts
Defunct shopping malls in the United States
Buildings and structures in Berkshire County, Massachusetts
Tourist attractions in Berkshire County, Massachusetts
Shopping malls established in 1988
Shopping malls disestablished in 2019
Lanesborough, Massachusetts